Ano Agios Ioannis is a village and a community of the Katerini municipality. Before the 2011 local government reform it was part of the municipality of Katerini, of which it was a municipal district. The 2011 census recorded 477 residents.

See also
 Katerini
 List of settlements in the Pieria regional unit

References

Populated places in Pieria (regional unit)